Authority is the power to command.

Authority or The Authority may also refer to:

Arts, entertainment, and media
Authority (album), a 2014 album by British electronic music group Client
"Authority" (Law & Order: Special Victims Unit), a ninth-season episode of Law & Order: Special Victims Unit
Authority (Southern Reach Trilogy), a 2014 book by Jeff VanderMeer, the second book in the Southern Reach trilogy
The Authority (comics), superhero comic book published by DC Comics, under the Wildstorm imprint, debuting in 1999
The Authority, His Dark Materials character who debuts in the 2000 novel The Amber Spyglass
The Authority, used by the autonomous council of vampire hierarchs in The Southern Vampire Mysteries novels and the TV series True Blood based on the novels

Internet
Authority, a grading of a blog's worthiness, used by Technorati
Authority, one of two scores assigned by the HITS algorithm, a scheme used for ranking web pages (also known as hubs and authorities)

Law
Legal authority, a right or permission to do something
Legal authority to arrest someone, known as the power of arrest
Authority, one of the sources of law in a particular legal system
Primary authority
Secondary authority
Authority in the law of agency, the ability of an agent to legally bind a principal
Apparent authority
Actual authority
Rational-legal authority, a sociological concept

Organizations
High Authority (disambiguation), any of several executive organizations or branches
Palestinian National Authority, the administrative organization established to govern the West Bank and Gaza Strip as a consequence of the 1994 Oslo Accords
Police authority (UK), a body charged with securing efficient and effective control of a territorial police area
Public authority, a government-chartered corporation such as a transit authority
The Authority (professional wrestling), a faction in WWE created by Triple H and Stephanie McMahon

Other uses
Authority (management), formal or legitimate, specified in a charter
Authority (sociology), the legitimate or socially approved use of power
Authority (textual criticism), a text's reliability as a witness to the author's intentions
Appeal to authority, a type of argument in logic
Authority control, in library and information science, standardization of the names of entities
Taxonomic authority, the scientist who first validly published a taxon name

See also
 Authoritarian personality, influential theory, developed in a 1950 book, by several UC Berkeley psychologists 
 Authoritarianism, describes a form of government characterized by an emphasis on the authority of the state in a republic or union